SVT may refer to:

Medicine
 Superficial vein thrombosis, a type of problematic blood clot
 Supraventricular tachycardia, an abnormal heart condition

Music
 SVT (band), an early-1980s American rock band
 Seventeen (South Korean band)

Organisations
 Soqosoqo ni Vakavulewa ni Taukei or the Fijian Political Party
 Special Vehicle Team, division of the Ford Motor Company
 Sudbury Valley Trustees, a regional land trust in eastern Massachusetts
 Sveriges Television, public broadcaster in Sweden

Technology
 S-VT, sequential valve timing
 Ampeg SVT, a super valve technology amplifier
 SVT-40, Samozaryadnaya Vintovka Tokareva, a WW2 semi-automatic rifle

Transport
 DRG Class SVT 877 and DRG Class SVT 137, series of streamlined diesel trainsets of the former Deutsche Reichsbahn-Gesellschaft  
 Sturtevant (Amtrak station)'s train station code
 Savuti Airport's IATA code

Other uses
 Superfluid vacuum theory